Hermitage is a small village and civil parish in the county of Dorset in southern England. Dorset County Council's latest (2013) estimate of the parish population is 70.

Augustinian monks once had a hermitage here (also known as the Blackmoor Priory Hermitage), whence the name of the village, but they abandoned the site in the 14th or 15th century. The Lady's Well which they used still remains, on the edge of woodland a short distance from the village.

Notes

External links

Hamlets in Dorset